The Plaxton Primo was a type of small low-floor bus body based on the Enterprise Bus Plasma. It was launched by Plaxton in 2005.

The Primo is the result of close co-operation between Enterprise Bus Ltd, the chassis manufacturer, and Plaxton. The fully welded stainless steel integral chassis is supplied in right hand drive format as a running unit to Plaxton. Final body assembly is undertaken by Plaxton in Scarborough, England.

The body and chassis design is also available in both one and two door left hand drive form in Continental Europe.

It was originally intended to replace the Plaxton Beaver (built on Mercedes-Benz Vario chassis), but pressure from small operators such as Western Greyhound persuaded Plaxton to continue the Beaver. This is because the larger Primo cannot fit down narrow roads that the Vario is suited to.

Much of the design of the Primo was put into the styling of the larger Plaxton Centro.

In 2008, Plaxton announced the Primo 2 with a number of modifications. The Primos in service were also modified to Mk2 form to enhance reliability.

As of 2014, the Primo is no longer available from Plaxton as its parent company Alexander Dennis phased it out in favour of its own Enviro200.

See also 
 List of buses

References

External links
Plaxton Primo Flickr gallery

Primo
Low-floor buses
Minibuses
Vehicles introduced in 2005